Nusrat Kasamanli (September 25/29 1946, Qazakh – October 16, 2003, Tabriz) was Azerbaijani poet.

Works 
Throughout his career he wrote:
 Sevirsənsə (If you love), 1971
 Gözlərimin qarası (Apple of my eyes), 1975
 Özümə bənzədiyim günlər (Days adorned for myself), 1979
 Gümüş yuxular (Silver dreams), 1981
 Təklikdə danışaq (Let's talk alone), 1983

References 
 
 

Azerbaijani poets
1946 births
2003 deaths
People from Qazax
20th-century Azerbaijani poets